There are two locations named Arroyo Hondo in the U.S. state of New Mexico:

 Arroyo Hondo, Santa Fe County, New Mexico
 Arroyo Hondo, Taos County, New Mexico